The Logie for Most Popular Reality Program is an award presented annually at the Australian TV Week Logie Awards. The award recognises the popularity of an Australian reality program.

The award was first awarded at the 42nd Annual TV Week Logie Awards ceremony, held in 2000. It was briefly renamed Best Reality Program (2016-2017). From 2018, the award category name was reverted to Most Popular Reality Program.

The winner and nominees of Most Popular Reality Program are chosen by the public through an online voting survey on the TV Week website. The Block holds the record for the most wins, with five, followed by MasterChef Australia with four wins.

Winners and nominees
Listed below are the winners of the award for each year, as well as the other nominees.

Multiple wins/nominations

References

Awards established in 2000